The 2022–23 UConn Huskies women's basketball team represents the University of Connecticut (UConn) during the 2022–23 NCAA Division I women's basketball season. The Huskies, led by Hall of Fame head coach Geno Auriemma in his 38th season at UConn, split their home games between Harry A. Gampel Pavilion on their campus in Storrs and the XL Center in Hartford, Connecticut. UConn is a member of the Big East Conference, which it joined in the 2020–21 season; it had been a member of the original Big East Conference from 1979 through 2013, and one of the original women's basketball teams in that conference in 1982.

The Huskies finished an injury-plagued previous season with a record of 30–6, losing the championship game of the 2022 NCAA women's basketball tournament to South Carolina. Three graduates from that squad were selected in the 2022 WNBA draft, but with six returning starters including the backcourt of Paige Bueckers, Azzi Fudd, and Nika Mühl, with forwards Dorka Juhász, Aaliyah Edwards, and Caroline Ducharme, UConn was expected to win the much improved Big East again. Bueckers tore an ACL in a pickup game before fall workouts, and five-star recruit Ice Brady suffered a tendon dislocation during an early practice; both players underwent season ending surgeries and sat on the bench all season.

Starting the season already down two players, UConn played surprisingly well against early opponents, with strong wins against #3 Texas, #10 NC State, and #9 Iowa in the first weeks. In the Texas game, Juhász injured a thumb and was sidelined for several weeks. Aubrey Griffin, who had redshirted the previous season because of injury, and Lou Lopez Sénéchal, a graduate transfer shooting guard from Fairfield University, got some starts and immediately impacted the team with their durability and shooting proficiency. Fudd began the season as a leading scorer, with Mühl leading the country in assists per game, and Edwards seemingly unstoppable in the paint. Fudd was injured in the loss to #7 Notre Dame, and by the end of December the Huskies only had seven players healthy, even after Juhász's return. On January 8, UConn's contest against DePaul was postponed because the Huskies only had six players able to play.

Even with a short bench, the Huskies continued to play well, dominating most conference opponents and picking up another quality win at Tennessee, the only team to score more than 60 points against the fierce UConn team defense in January. In early February the team matched up against the #1 ranked South Carolina Gamecocks with a sold-out home crowd in the XL Center, but lost 77–81. Three days later, Marquette upset the noticeably worn-out Huskies in a tight defensive battle, UConn's first consecutive loss in 30 years. While UConn was able to twice defeat rival Villanova, several Big East teams strongly tested the still-shorthanded and battered Huskies, St. John's outscoring them by five. UConn finished their regular season with an overall record of 26–5 and a conference record of 18–2. They won the Big East regular season championship and were the top seed in the conference tournament. Azzi Fudd and Caroline Ducharme both returned in time for the Big East tournament, and with the UConn squad healthy for the first time since its first games, the Huskies methodically notched three consecutive wins to emerge as tournament champions, getting the automatic bid to the 2023 NCAA women's basketball tournament.

Previous season
UConn was ranked no. 2 in both the 2021 AP and Coaches pre-season polls. After some early struggles, they finished the regular season with a record of 22–5, including 16–1 in the Big East to win the conference regular season championship. UConn then won the Big East tournament. As a no. 2 seed in the NCAA tournament, they advanced to the championship game, where they lost to South Carolina. UConn finished their campaign with a record of 30–6.

Offseason

Departures
The Huskies graduated senior starters Christyn Williams, Olivia Nelson-Ododa, and Evina Westbrook from the 2021–22 roster, each of them being drafted into the Women's National Basketball Association. Sophomore Piath Gabriel chose to enter the transfer portal during the offseason and accepted a scholarship at UMass.

Incoming transfers

The Huskies added Lou Lopez Sénéchal, a graduate student from Grenoble, France, who transferred from Fairfield University. While at Fairfield, Lopez Sénéchal was the 2021–22 MAAC Player of the Year and was three-time All-MAAC First Team. She had one year of eligibility remaining.

Injuries
UConn lost two players to knee injuries during the 2022 offseason. On August 1, superstar guard Paige Bueckers tore her left ACL during a pick-up game, and UConn announced two days later that she would miss the entire 2022–23 season. Then, during a Huskies practice on October 21, freshman forward Ice Brady dislocated her right patellar tendon; she underwent season-ending surgery on October 25.

Recruiting
The Huskies had another excellent recruiting class. ESPN ranked Patterson as the fourth-best recruit of the 2022 class and Brady as the fifth-best. Brady would be lost for the 2022–23 season to a knee injury. Bettencourt was recruited just before the start of the season.

Recruiting class of 2023
The Huskies continue to recruit well. ESPN evaluated UConn's class of 2023 as the fourth-ranked group, behind LSU, South Carolina, and Arizona.

Recruiting class of 2024
On December 3, 2022, UConn received a verbal commitment from five-star guard Allie Ziebell of Neenah, Wisconsin.

Coaching
Hall of Fame head coach Geno Auriemma and Hall of Fame associate head coach Chris Dailey returned for their 38th season. Assistant coach Jamelle Elliott was a UConn assistant coach from 1998 to 2009 and returned after a nine-year head coaching stint at Cincinnati. Assistant coach Morgan Valley was the head coach of the Hartford Hawks when hired by the Huskies. Elliott and Valley are both former UConn players.

Roster

Game summaries

Exhibition

Kutztown 
The Huskies began the season by hosting the Kutztown Golden Bears in an exhibition contest, the first meeting between the two schools. It was not the first time the Golden Bears had visited Storrs, however. On their return from a 2017 exhibition game against UMass, the Kutztown women were invited to tour the UConn campus and attend practice. Katie Lou Samuelson later said the Huskies wanted to show Kutztown "...what it means to be at this university and what we've been working for." In the November 6, 2022 exhibition at the XL Center, the Golden Bears briefly led 7–6 at the start, but the Huskies quickly took over, taking a 30 point lead into halftime. The final tally was 115–42.

Regular season

Northeastern 
UConn opened the regular season with a 98–39 win against the Huskies of Northeastern. Azzi Fudd led all scorers with 26 points, and Lou Lopez Sénéchal scored 17. Forwards Aaliyah Edwards and Dorka Juhász each recorded double doubles, Edwards with 12 rebounds and 14 points, and Juhász with 11 rebounds and 14 points. Aubrey Griffin, who had redshirted the previous season due to injury, came off the bench to hit six of seven field goal attempts including her only three-point attempt, scoring 13 points.

Texas 
An early season home contest against a top ten opponent is always highly anticipated, but the second game against number three Texas was a rematch for Husky graduate transfer Lou Lopez Sénéchal. After a loss in NCAA tournament play against Texas ended her four-year career at Fairfield University, Lopez Sénéchal found herself with an extra year of eligibility (due to COVID) and through the transfer portal arrived in Storrs. She prepared herself to play Texas, saying "... losing the last game of your season and then playing them the second game of the season is something I'm looking forward to."

In a November 14 sell-out of Harry A. Gampel Pavilion, the fifth-ranked UConn Huskies met the third-ranked Texas Longhorns. The first half was a rugged defensive contest; UConn held onto a slim three-point lead at halftime. The Huskies gradually widened the margin in the second half, briefly opening up a 17-point advantage. The final score favored UConn 83–76. Sénéchal scored 12 points, while Azzi Fudd led all scorers with a career-high 32 points. After the game, Texas coach Vic Schaefer said, "It ain't no different than any other year around here. They are really good." Juhász left the game with a hand injury, later determined to be a broken thumb which kept her out for the next five games.

NC State 
For the second time in a week, UConn faced a top ten squad: the 10th rated NC State Wolfpack. The two teams clashed in the previous season's NCAA tournament regional final, dubbed a "double overtime thriller" by Sports Illustrated. NC State's Jakia Brown-Turner drilled a three-pointer with 0.8 seconds remaining to tie the first overtime. Paige Bueckers hit her first two shots in the next period and the Huskies went on to win 91–87, sending UConn to its 22nd Final Four.

This year's game would not be nearly as dramatic, at least within the confines of the game itself. The teams lined up for the pregame national anthem, and after the anthem was completed, UConn's associate head coach Chris Dailey fainted and was taken off the court on a stretcher. Auriemma reported, "The players were pretty taken back by it, and I didn't know what to expect going out there." The players managed to pull it together and started the game with a 9–0 run. Although the Wolfpack closed within five points late in the second quarter, the Huskies extended their lead to as much as 24 points in the second half and ended up with a lopsided 91–69 win. Fudd again scored 32 points, but the stat of the day was recorded by Nika Mühl, whose 15 assists set an all-time school record.

Duke 
UConn was a participant in the Phil Knight invitational tournament, a basketball event held to celebrate the co-founder of Nike. Earlier events in 2017 and 2019 included only men's teams, but the 2022 event was extended to women's teams as well. UConn was one of four teams in the Legacy bracket, along with Duke, their first round opponent, Iowa, and Oregon State.

The game was close early on with the score tied at 13 with just under three minutes left in the first quarter, but UConn went on a 10–1 run to finish the quarter and was never threatened again. Lopez Sénéchal Was the leading scorer with 23 points, the first time this season she was the leading scorer for the team. Nika Mühl recorded double digit assists with 10, while Edwards had a double double with 11 rebounds and 17 points. The final score was 78—50.

Iowa 
UConn faced ninth ranked Iowa in the tournament finale, their third top 10 opponent in the last four games. The Huskies had a modest lead in the first quarter, leading by seven, 18–11, with just over three minutes to go. The second and beginning of the third quarters would belong to the Hawkeyes, as they put together a 13–2 run in the second quarter and an 11–2 run in the third quarter to take an 11 point lead, causing Auriemma to call a timeout. The Huskies responded, led by Azzi Fudd who hit seven out of seven field goal attempts in the third quarter for 16 points. Iowa came back in the fourth quarter, turning a four point deficit into a five point advantage, but Lopez Sénéchal and Ducharme threes helped the Huskies recover and go on to win 86–79. Fudd was one of five Huskies with double-digit scoring, and Mühl led the team in assists with 13.

Providence 
Less than four minutes into the game, the Huskies were ahead 10–0. With just under two minutes left in the first quarter, UConn was leading 27–6, inspiring the Journal Inquirer's Carl Adamec to comment, "It took the UConn women's basketball team only eight minutes of playing time Friday night to make all the suspense associated with its game with Providence about individual statistics." The final score of 98–53 was decidedly in favor of the Huskies, but Adamec was right about individual statistics. Mühl recorded double-digit assists in her fourth consecutive game, which set a single-season record for the Huskies. Edward recorded a double-double for the fourth consecutive game, a personal best. At the time, Mühl's assists per game average was 11.0, which was the highest in Division I women's basketball.

Notre Dame 
Notre Dame was just three days removed from their only loss of the season, a buzzer beater loss to Maryland on a last second shot by Diamond Miller. Now they faced Connecticut on their home court, but they had not beaten UConn at home since 2013. Notre Dame's Olivia Miles started out strongly, scoring the team's first seven points. The score was tied at 13, but then the Irish built and extended the lead. Fudd injured her right knee, left the game early in the second quarter, and did not return. Notre Dame expanded the lead to 17. The Huskies tried to respond and cut the lead to five, but the Irish built the lead back to double digits and coasted to a 74–60 win. Notre Dame hit 50% of the field-goal attempts and 46% of their three-point attempts and held the Huskies to under 37% field-goal shooting.

Princeton 
Winning the game is typically the primary goal, but it is rarely the only goal. In addition to developmental goals — getting more time for some bench players, working on specific offenses or defenses in a real game as opposed to practice, there also are records, both at the individual and the team level that may be at stake in a particular game. This game featured more than the usual number of such records. The Huskies were the holders of a somewhat obscure, but impressively long streak — they had not lost back-to-back games since the start of the 1993–94 season, a streak now at 1,066 games, started long before any player on the current team had been born. It was the first time UConn had ever played Princeton, and the Huskies were on a 93 game winning streak when playing against first-time opponents. They also had a 76 consecutive games streak against an opponent with a former Auriemma player or assistant coach on the staff. Having just lost to Notre Dame, and former UConn player Carla Berube coaching the Tigers, all three of these streaks were on the line.

The game was within a point about halfway through the first quarter, but then the Huskies went on a small run, then extended the lead to 31–16, and it seemed the Husky fans could relax. However, Nika Mühl suffered a concussion early in the second half, knocking her out of the game. UConn's lead was still double digits when the fourth quarter started, but the Tigers started clawing their way back and cut the margin to a slim two points, 66–64, with 30 seconds left to go in the game. Inês Bettencourt was a freshman to-be headed to a Florida junior college when Paige Bueckers was injured during the summer, and UConn hastily looked for additional guard help. Bettencourt was persuaded to join the Huskies and now found herself on the court with the game on the line. She ended up hitting three of four free throws in the final 21.7 seconds, including two critical shots with 2.7 seconds left in the game that helped clinch the win. UConn won 69–64 and extended their three streaks.

Maryland 
UConn traveled to Maryland with only seven players available to suit up for the game. It wasn't the first time UConn faced Maryland shorthanded — in November 2013, the Huskies only had seven scholarship players available for the game. But it's one thing to have seven players available when five of them will go on to be WNBA first-round draft picks, and it's another thing to be down to seven players because four starters are sitting on the bench. The shorthanded team started out encouragingly, leading 15–7 six minutes into the game. The lead was down to two points at the end of the quarter, and then Maryland outscored UConn by eleven points in the second quarter.

Maryland extended the lead to 10 in the third quarter, but UConn tied it up at 62 points apiece early in the fourth quarter. The game continued to be relatively close, but Maryland held the lead through the final buzzer, winning 85–78. Abby Myers, who transferred to Maryland from Princeton, was the leading scorer for Maryland with 20 points, hitting four of her eight three-point attempts.

Florida State 
UConn returned Juhász and Mühl to the starting lineup, but minutes before the tip off, the school announced that head coach Auriemma would not be available due to illness. Associate head coach Chris Dailey stepped in for the 15th time in her career. The Basketball Hall of Fame Women's Showcase was played at Mohegan Sun Arena. The Huskies started strongly, scoring 10 consecutive points before Florida State made the first basket about four minutes into the game. UConn extended the lead to 15 points by the end of the first quarter and more slowly in the second quarter, but ended the half with a seemingly comfortable 51–35 lead. The second half was a different story, as Florida State cut into a 20 point lead and reduced the margin to four points with 3:19 left in the game. The Huskies responded and ended up with the win, 85–77. Edwards ended with 26 points, while Lopez Sénéchal has 23.

Seton Hall 
Auriemma was again unavailable for the game against Seton Hall. His doctor recommended that he take a few days off to fully recover.

The team started out strong as they had against Florida State, ending the first quarter with a 25–10 lead. Unlike the game against Florida State, they did not let up and let the game get close in the second half. Although Seton Hall outscored the Huskies by six points in the fourth quarter, that simply cut a 30 point lead down to 25. Mühl had 16 points and 11 assists and got her first career double double. Juhász also recorded a double double with 10 points and rebounds. The final score in favor of the Huskies was 98–73.

Creighton 
UConn traveled to Nebraska to play Creighton in front of a sellout crowd, with only seven players dressed. Amari DeBerry went home for the Christmas break to the Buffalo area and was unable to get a flight to Omaha. Aubrey Griffin tested positive for COVID and was unable to play. The remaining seven held the Blue Jays to their worst offensive performance of the year. Although the Blue Jays recorded more three-pointers than the Huskies, they only hit 10.7% of their attempts. The two point shooting was not much better, with an overall field-goal percentage of under 24%. The storyline was the play of Edwards and Juhász, who each recorded a double double. Edwards had 23 points and 20 rebounds, the first 20 rebound effort for UConn in over a decade. The team combined for 59 rebounds against 27 for Creighton. The final score in favor of UConn was 72–47.

Marquette 
Eight players dressed for Marquette once DeBerry rejoined the team, but fans held their collective breaths when Juhász has knocked to the ground and had to be helped to the sideline. She received an ovation when she got back into the game and even louder when she nailed a three pointer. The game was a relatively low-scoring game, but UConn prevailed 61–48 behind 22 points for Lopez Sénéchal and 19 for Ducharme.

Butler 
In January 2023, the team traveled to Indianapolis for games against Butler and Xavier. Auriemma traveled with the team and attended the morning shootaround but was not feeling well and decided to sit out the evening game, so Dailey took over again as head coach. Ducharme was missing form the lineup due to concussion protocol. UConn scored the first eight points, leading Butler to call a timeout. After Butler scored, UConn went on a 10–0 run. Edwards was dominant for the Huskies, outscoring the Bulldogs herself in the opening quarter. Butler did better in the second quarter, hitting multiple threes and cutting the lead to five points before UConn closed the half leading by 14. UConn was dominant in the third period and coasted to the 33 point victory, 80–47. Daily was now 16–0 as acting head coach.

Xavier 
Dailey filled in for Auriemma once more, as the head coach was unavailable due to illness. Only eight players dressed for the game, and when Edwards crashed into chairs on the sidelines tracking down an errant ball, the team had only seven players for the rest of the game. "We had enough people to finish the game, so that's a good sign," said Dailey. "We've tried holy water. We've tried sage burning. None of them seem to work. It's just something we have to deal with. Whoever we have, we feel like we have enough." UConn started off the game slowly, hitting only one of the first nine shots but then started scoring, opening up a 31 point by halftime. Griffin had 17 points in the first half, while Juhász went eight for 12 in the game, scoring 18 points. Dailey was now 17–0 when filling in for Auriemma.

St. John's 
So many UConn players were injured or otherwise unavailable by January 7, 2023 that the next day's home game against DePaul was postponed, due to insufficient players to meet the NCAA minimum of seven. UConn's next game was at St. John's on January 11.

Fans anxious for Fudd's return were encouraged when photos of her in the afternoon shootaround emerged with her wearing braids, a hairstyle she reserves for game days. "I always have my hair in two braids for games," Fudd said with a smile. "The past couple games it's been in a bun." The observation proved accurate, as Fudd came off the bench and played 20 minutes, scoring 14 points including two of four three-pointers. Edwards had a good game, hitting more than half her field-goal attempts, and on a night when the team free throw shooting wasn't overly impressive, she hit five of six. Her minutes were a bit limited due to foul problems, but she still managed to play good defense and record 15 points. Juhász hit 8 of her 14 field-goal attempts and recorded a double-double with 18 points and 10 rebounds and added seven assists. Lopez Sénéchal recorded about as efficient a 20 point output as you can manage. She took nine shots, hitting eight of them, hitting all four two-point shots and all but one of her three-point shots. Griffin helped the team hold St. John's leading scorer to well below her scoring average. The team had 62.3% of the field goal attempts, a season-high, which led to a 30 point margin of victory, 82–52, over the Red Storm.

Georgetown 
UConn followed up its 30 point win against St. John's with a game against Georgetown, a team St. John's beat by 20 points, 68–48, on December 31, 2022. Georgetown came into the game with only a single win in the Big East, having beaten last-place and winless in conference Xavier. On paper it seemed like it should be an easy win. The game didn't start that way. Georgetown led at the end of the first quarter and was down by only a single point at the half. Auriemma explained, "We didn't have the energy to get us through some of the missed shots... It settled into an ugly scrum kind of a game. We couldn't get any kind of flow."

The Huskies did better in the third quarter, starting with a 16–2 run and following up with 12 unanswered points to pull out to a 65–41 lead. UConn ended up with a 15 point margin of victory, 65–50. Edwards had a double double with 17 points and 11 rebounds. Fudd banged her previously injured knee in the first half, left the game, and didn't return, sitting on the bench with an ice pack on her knee.

Butler 
UConn scored twice before the game was a minute old, but then went over five minutes without a single point during which Butler ran off 13 consecutive points. The Bulldogs would score only six more points in the first half, while the Huskies would add 32 to take a 36–19 lead at the half. They then opened the second half with a run of 10 consecutive points and went on to easily win the game by 40 points, 79–39, despite having only seven players available.

The win represented the 10th consecutive win for UConn. Before Auriemma took over the coaching duties, the longest consecutive win streak by the Huskies was five games. UConn had now recorded a 10 or more game consecutive win streak in 17 consecutive seasons.

Three Huskies – Edwards, Griffin, and Lopez Sénéchal – were tied with 17 points apiece with two minutes left in the game. Edwards hit a layup and a foul shot to reach 20 points.

DePaul 
UConn played DePaul on January 23, a game originally scheduled for January 8, but on that date, the Huskies were down to six available scholarship players, one fewer than the minimum required by Big East rules. The team had eight players available for this game. DePaul had All-American Aneesah Morrow on their team, who scored 20 points and pulled down 12 rebounds, but UConn's Edwards had 23 points, 10 rebounds, and four assists on 10 of 13 shooting to lead the Huskies to a 94–51 win over the Blue Demons. The Huskies had three other players with double-digit scoring: Griffin with 18, Sénéchal with 20, and Juhász with 19. Mühl had 10 assists, the eighth time she's had double-digit assists this year, setting a school record for a single season.

Tennessee 
The Huskies were still shorthanded when they faced Tennessee, with only eight players available to play. One of the available players did not play, one played under two minutes, and one played 10 minutes. All five starters played 36 minutes or more, with Mühl playing all 40 minutes. The crowd of 13,804 was the largest Lady Vols crowd in the arena since 2015.

The Huskies opened strong, scoring 33 points in the first quarter and holding the Lady Vols to 17. Tennessee turned the tables in the second quarter, holding the Huskies to only seven points in scoring 19 to cut the lead to four points at halftime. Although Tennessee briefly cut the lead to two points early in the third quarter, UConn dominated the third quarter, outscoring Tennessee by nine and extending their lead to 13. The lead expanded to 19 points at the largest with the Huskies getting the win, 84–67.

Lopez Sénéchal scored a season-high 26 points, while Edwards was close behind with 25. Mühl contributed 14 assists, one off the school record set by her earlier in the season. Connecticut hit 55% of their overall field goals and 57% of their three-point attempts. Tennessee's Jorden Horsten had missed her previous game with an illness but came in off the bench and led all scorers with 27 points.

Villanova 
UConn hosted the second place team in the Big East, Villanova, in front of 14,375 fans. After Villanova's leading scorer Maddy Siegrist hit an opening three pointer, the Huskies responded with nine consecutive points. As the first quarter drew to a close, Connecticut appeared to be in charge, leading 25–17. The second quarter was a different story, with the Wildcats defense holding the Huskies to eight points, and the margin was cut to three points at halftime. Husky fans traditionally stand at the beginning of the game and the beginning of the second half and rhythmically clap until the first UConn score. In this game, the crowd stood until Lopez Sénéchal hit a free throw with only 3:33 left in the quarter. By this time, Villanova had taken the lead. The Wildcats were still leading halfway through the final quarter, but UConn went on a 15–4 run to retake the lead. The Huskies were leading by five with 31 seconds left in the game, but a Wildcats steal leading to a three pointer cut the lead to two. Edwards made one of two free throws, and Villanova had two shots in a three pointer which would've tied the game with only four seconds to go. Those shots failed, and Edwards hit two final free throws to seal the win, 63–58.

Providence 
The game played against Providence in December at Connecticut's campus location was very one-sided, with the Huskies winning by 45 points. The return engagement in Providence was very different. Although the Huskies led the entire game, after opening up a 15 point lead, the Friars cut the lead to six in the third quarter. UConn responded with a 13–2 run to extend their lead to 17, but the Friars cut it back to single digits with just over three minutes to go. Connecticut ended up with a 10 point win, 64–54, thanks to a double double by Juhász with 19 points and 17 rebounds.

South Carolina 
The Huskies started strong, opening up a 25–14 lead at the end of the first quarter. The Gamecocks responded in the second quarter, and the game was tied at halftime. A technical foul late in the game gave two foul shots to South Carolina and possession, resulting in four points, extending the six-point lead to 10 points with under four minutes to go. With 1:20 to go, a technical foul was called on South Carolina during a basket attempt by Edwards. UConn hit one of two free throw attempts by Edwards, and one of two free throw shots associated with the technical by Lopez Sénéchal and then scored on the subsequent possession to cut the lead to six. The Huskies would go on to score nine more points in the final minute, but South Carolina scored six from the free-throw line to hang on to the win, 81–77.

Marquette 
The game against Marquette was the second matchup between the two teams this season, with the Huskies beating Marquette at home by 13 points on New Year's Eve. The game at Marquette started out with UConn scoring three consecutive baskets, leading 6–0 three minutes into the game.  Marquette responded, outscoring UConn 16–4 through the next seven minutes, and led by six points at the end of the first quarter. The Golden Eagles continued their dominance in the beginning of the second period, taking a 23–10 lead. UConn managed to tie up the game in the third quarter but never took another lead. A late 6–0 run by Marquette put the game out of reach.

This loss to Marquette following their loss to South Carolina meant UConn had lost back-to-back games, something that had not happened to the team since 1993. The AP described this as ending "one of the most remarkable achievements in college basketball history."

Georgetown 
Following rare back to back losses, Connecticut faced Georgetown, a team the Huskies had beaten 33 consecutive times. The Hoyas threatened early, opening up a seven-point advantage and leading 17–13 at the end of the first quarter. They were down by only three points down partway through the third quarter. Georgetown cut the margin to four with half a minute left in the game but UConn hit their final four free throws to get the 67–59 win. Juhász and Griffin each had 18 points for the Huskies, while Georgetown's Fauntleroy had 24 points.

Creighton 
In front of a sold-out crowd, the Huskies played the Blue Jays almost even in the first quarter, then gradually opened up a nine point lead with 3 1/2 minutes to go in the half. Creighton cut the lead back to two points at halftime, then took the lead and extended it to 11 points on the opening play of the fourth quarter. Ducharme, who had been scoreless in first three quarters of the game, scored 10 points in the fourth quarter, helping to give the Huskies the lead. UConn was up by two points when Creighton's Lauren Jensen, an 84% free throw shooter, went to the line with 0.7 seconds left in the game and a chance to tie the game. However, she missed the first so deliberately missed the second hoping for a rebound, but the rebound was secured by Edwards to end the game.

Villanova 
UConn took on Villanova, ranked number 14 at the time, at their home court. Villanova was led by Maddy Siegrist, who averaged over 29 points a game, leading the Division I in scoring. A week earlier, she had scored 50 points in a game to set a school and conference record for a single game. The game was close through the first three quarters, with UConn holding a five-point lead at the beginning of the fourth quarter. The Huskies outscored the Wildcats 8–1 in the opening minutes of the quarter, pushing the margin to a 12 point lead, but the Wildcats scored 10 consecutive points over the next 4 1/2 minutes to cut the margin to two points. That was as close as Villanova would get, with Lopez Sénéchal scoring a "crucial rainbow jumper late in the fourth quarter" to lead the Huskies to a 60–51 win.

St. John's 
UConn played St. John's at their home court in mid-January, beating them by 30 points. This game was at UConn's downtown arena — a win would give UConn a share of the Big East regular-season title. The game unfolded very differently than the game at St. John's. The game was very close at the midpoint of the first quarter, but then St. John's opened up a small lead, which became a nine point lead early in the second quarter. The Red Storm still had a five-point lead at the half. The Huskies came out in the second half with suffocating defense, holding the Red Storm scoreless for almost six minutes, taking a modest 43–35 lead. The Red Storm responded and held the Huskies scoreless for five minutes, a stretch covering the last two minutes of the third quarter and extending into the fourth quarter. St. John's opened up a modest lead of six points, which the Huskies cut to two points, but could not retake the lead, and the Red Storm ended up with the win, 69–64. This marked five consecutive games in which the Huskies did not score 70 points, which was the longest such streak since 1992. Coach Auriemma noted, "It would have been a sin if they lost that game. They played so well and so hard. They played like they were the better team, and they were."

DePaul 
Connecticut travel to Chicago to play DePaul in the second of the conference home-and-home series. The earlier game had been rescheduled from January 8 because the Huskies did not have enough players to suit up. When the game was finally rescheduled, UConn beat DePaul by 43 points. This game would be different. The game was very close until late in the third quarter when DePaul opened up a seven point lead. The Blue Demons continued to hold a small lead until the Huskies tied it with just over three minutes to go. A DePaul turnover led to a UConn basket, and then Mühl hit a three pointer to give UConn a five-point lead. DePaul responded with two free throws and a layup to cut the lead to a single point with 17 seconds remaining. DePaul's best player, Aneesah Morrow, who had 25 points in the game, had the ball and raced down the court in an attempt to take the lead but was tied up, and the possession went to UConn. DePaul was forced to foul. The Huskies hit two free throws, and DePaul missed a three point jumper at the buzzer, giving UConn a 72–69 win.

Xavier 
UConn closed the regular-season portion of the schedule with a game at home against Xavier, a team they had beaten at Xavier by 36 points. Xavier had lost all 19 games against Big East teams that season. The Huskies were up 20–11 early in the first quarter, but Xavier cut the lead to two points at the end of the quarter and took a lead briefly in the second quarter. The Huskies buckled down and extended the lead to 18 points, but the Musketeers did not wilt and cut the lead to single digits late in the game. UConn won the game 60–51, but the single-digit margin of victory represented a "school-record eight consecutive single-figure games." Mühl's seven assists in the game brought her season total to 236 which broke the school record set by Sue Bird in 2002.

Big East tournament

Georgetown 
After a first round bye, UConn's matchup in the quarterfinals was Georgetown, a team who had played the Huskies within eight points a few weeks earlier. However, the Huskies had Azzi Fudd, who had missed the last 14 games. She did not start but entered the game midway through the first quarter to a roar from the crowd. While she did not hit her opening shots, teammate Edwards expressed how the team felt about her return, "But Azzi coming back, I think she adds a lot to the team both offensively and defensively and it showed tonight. And even though it took her a couple of shots to get into the rhythm, she did knock them down eventually, which we all knew that she would."

UConn started quickly with a 15–2 run in the first quarter. The Huskies held Georgetown to a single field goal in the second quarter and reached halftime with a 35–12 lead. They ended up winning by 30 points, 69–39, led by Edwards' 19 points and 13 rebounds.

Marquette 
UConn faced Marquette in the semifinals of the Big East tournament. In the most recent meeting on February 8, Marquette defeated UConn 59–52, giving UConn back to back losses for the first time since 1993. Neither Ducharme nor Fudd were available for that game, while both were available for the semifinal. UConn opened with a 9–2 run and never relinquished the lead. The Golden Eagles did have and 8–0 run in the second quarter, but that only cut the margin to five points. The Huskies responded with a 12–2 run to take a 15 point halftime lead. Three UConn players – Edwards, Juhász, and Mühl – recorded double doubles as UConn advanced to the Big East tournament final with an 81–52 win.

Villanova 
The Big East tournament championship game featured the top two ranked teams in the conference, UConn at number seven and Villanova at number 10. It is the only conference tournament this season to feature two top 10 ranked teams in the finals. The Huskies beat Villanova in their two regular-season games, but the margin in both games was single digits. Villanova had Maddy Siegrist, the nation's leading scorer. After the final regular-season game, a single-digit victory over Xavier which was the first team in 40 years to go without a win in Big East regular-season play, Auriemma drove home thinking about recent games. The next time he went to practice he challenged the team, "You guys have exactly three days to fix whatever it is that happened, either internally yourself or team-wise. Take a look at it or the season is going to end in the next two weeks."

The team responded. The game was close until the middle of the second quarter when UConn ran off nine consecutive points. A few minutes later they scored 12 consecutive points. At the end of the third quarter they had a 22 point margin. Edwards posted her third double double in as many days with 19 points and 15 rebounds. Her three-day performance earned her the most outstanding player of the tournament.

NCAA Tournament

Vermont 
UConn faced Vermont in the opening round of the NCAA tournament. Fudd scored 11 seconds into the game on an assist by Edwards and UConn opened up a seven point lead before Vermont scored. Edwards ended up scoring 28 points, a career high, helping the Huskies to a 95 – 52 when over the Catamounts. The win gave the Huskies a 30 win season, the 26th time this is happened in the last 30 seasons. Every one of the 10 Husky players scored, the first time that has happened all season.

Schedule

|-
!colspan=12 style=""| Exhibition 

|-
!colspan=12 style=| Regular season

|-
!colspan=12 style=|Big East tournament

|-
!colspan=12 style=|NCAA tournament

Rankings

Player statistics

Awards and honors
 Aaliyah Edwards
 Associated Press third-team All-American
 United States Basketball Writers Association third-team All-American
 Big East Most Improved Player
 First-team All-Big East
 Big East tournament Most Outstanding Player

 Nika Mühl
 Big East Defensive Player of the Year
 Second-team All-Big East

 Lou Lopez Sénéchal
 First-team All-Big East

 Dorka Juhász
 Second-team All-Big East

See also
2022–23 UConn Huskies men's basketball team

Footnotes

References

UConn Huskies women's basketball seasons
UConn
UConn
UConn
UConn